Jeanette Winter is an American author and illustrator, best known for her children's books, many of which are about notable women in history, especially artists.

Career 
Jeanette Winter is particularly known for her painted illustration style, which uses flat planes of color and "uncluttered" compositions, a style which has drawn comparisons to the folk art tradition. Winter has had a prolific career, working on dozens of children's books including books about Georgia O'Keeffe, Hildegard Van Bingen, Iqbal Masih, Jane Goodall, and Henri Matisse. Winter currently lives in New York City.

References 

21st-century American writers
Living people
1939 births
American women illustrators
American children's book illustrators
American women children's writers
American children's writers
21st-century American women writers